"You're Going to Lose That Girl" is a song by the English rock band the Beatles from their 1965 album and film Help! Credited to the Lennon–McCartney songwriting partnership, the song was mostly written by John Lennon with contributions from Paul McCartney.

Composition and recording
Credited to the Lennon–McCartney partnership, Walter Everett and Ian MacDonald both refer to the song as Lennon's. In his official biography Paul McCartney: Many Years from Now, Paul McCartney estimates the writing as 60–40 to John Lennon. The song was likely written in January or February 1965. In a 16 January 1965 interview with Ray Coleman for Melody Maker magazine, Lennon explained he had only written "half a song" for the Beatles' next film. From 25 January to 7 February, Lennon and his wife Cynthia vacationed in the Austrian Alps with Beatles producer George Martin and Martin's future wife, Judy Lockhart-Smith. The time off from touring provided Lennon, McCartney and George Harrison time to write new songs, eventually recording 11 new tracks between 15 and 20 February.

The Beatles recorded two takes and overdubs of "You're Going to Lose That Girl" during an afternoon session at EMI on 19 February 1965. The next day Martin, assisted by engineers Norman Smith and Ken Scott, mixed the song for mono. On 23 February while the Beatles filmed scenes for Help! in The Bahamas, engineers Smith and Malcolm Davies mixed the song for stereo twice, preferring the second mix over the first. On 30 March the Beatles recorded more overdubs onto the song. An electric piano and Harrison's original guitar solo were erased from the original tape. Everett describes the original guitar solo as "tortured" due to the heavy string gauge on Harrison's brand new Fender Stratocaster. Harrison recorded a new guitar solo, Ringo Starr played bongos and McCartney played piano. On 2 April Martin, assisted by Smith, made another stereo mix of the song using the 30 March overdubs. This stereo mix was included on both the UK and US stereo releases of Help!

In the film Help!
In the film, the group appears singing this song in the recording studio. In addition to the group's familiar guitar-and-drum setup, there is also footage of Paul McCartney at a piano and Ringo Starr playing the bongos, both miming instruments they had overdubbed onto the recording. Towards the end, one of the thugs uses a chainsaw to saw a hole in the floor around the drum kit. The producer reports that they will have to re-record the song due to a buzzing noise, at which point The Beatles begin asking one another who was buzzing. As they look to Ringo, he and the drums fall through the floor.

Release
Help! was released by EMI's Parlophone label on 6 August 1965, with "You're Going to Lose That Girl" sequenced as the sixth track between "Another Girl" and "Ticket to Ride". Capitol released the soundtrack album in North America with an altered track listing as Help! on 13 August. The track, instead titled "You're Gonna Lose That Girl", is eleventh and sequenced between two orchestral pieces. The track is the first use of Harrison's Sonic Blue Fender Stratocaster, with ones gifted to him and Lennon during the Beatles' 1965 US tour. The guitar remained one of Harrison's favorites for the rest of his career and featured heavily on the Beatles next album, Rubber Soul.

Writer Jacqueline Warwick describes the track as an "advice" song, comparable to "She Loves You" and the Beatles' earlier covers of girl groups. Everett describes McCartney and Harrison's responsorial backing vocals as being heavily influenced by Motown music. Warwick imagines Motown based choreography for the song: "it's easy to picture Paul and George shimmying and wagging their fingers if only they hadn't instruments to contend with." In his musicological analysis of the song's chord progressions, Everett describes the changes as "jarringly original". MacDonald describes the track as one of the few recorded during the Help! sessions that stands up, singling out the vocals in particular.

Bill Wyman interprets the Ramones song "You're Gonna Kill That Girl" as a parody of the song.

Personnel
According to Ian MacDonald, except where noted:

John Lennon double-tracked lead vocal, rhythm guitar
Paul McCartney backing vocal, bass guitar, piano
George Harrison backing vocal, lead guitar
Ringo Starr drums, bongos

Notes

References

Sources

External links 

 

The Beatles songs
Song recordings produced by George Martin
1965 songs
Songs written for films
Songs written by Lennon–McCartney
Songs published by Northern Songs
1969 singles
Apple Records singles